Hubert Wilson may refer to:

Hubert Wilson, explorer, see George Fleming
Hubert Wilson (baseball) (1902–1981), American baseball player
Hub Wilson (James Hubert Wilson, 1909–1999), ice hockey player
Hubert Wilson (politician), see Longford–Westmeath

See also
Bert Wilson (disambiguation)